Escape is a 30-minute British television anthology series about escapes from German prisoner of war camps during World War II. The series was produced by and aired on the BBC in 1957. It was adapted from Aidan Crawley's book Escape from Germany 1939–1945.

Morris Barry directed the filmed inserts, while Ronald Eyre directed the studio sequences. Among its guest stars were Michael Caine and Roy Dotrice. As usual for the period, it was transmitted live; no recordings are known to survive.

References

External links

1950s British drama television series
1957 British television series debuts
1957 British television series endings
BBC television dramas
1950s British anthology television series
English-language television shows
Black-and-white British television shows